Marcin Gawron and Mateusz Kowalczyk were the defenders of title, but they chose to not compete together.
Gawron partnered up with Jerzy Janowicz. However, they lost to Jan Hájek and Dušan Karol in the first round.
Kowalczyk played with Grzegorz Panfil, but they were eliminated by Rubén Ramírez Hidalgo and Santiago Ventura in the quarterfinals.
Pablo Santos and Gabriel Trujillo-Soler became the new champions, after their won 6–3, 7–6(3), against Hájek and Karol in the final.

Seeds

Draw

Draw

References
 Doubles Draw

Polska Energia Open - Doubles
ZRE Katowice Bytom Open